Santa María de Cayón is a municipality in the province and autonomous community of Cantabria, northern Spain. According to the 2020 census, it has a population of 9,167 inhabitants.

The biggest town inside the municipality is not its capital (where the town hall is located, and which gives name to the municipality), but rather the town of Sarón.

Sister cities or towns 
Santa María de Cayón is twinned with Gujan-Mestras, France

Towns
 San Román.
 La Penilla.
 Argomilla.
 La Encina.
 Sarón.
 Santa María de Cayón (capital).
 La Abadilla.
 Esles.
 Totero.
 Lloreda.

References

External links
Official website 
Cantabria 102 municipalities - Santa María de Cayón 

Municipalities in Cantabria